Adolfo Fernández Cavada (May 17, 1832 – December 18, 1871) was a soldier and diplomat, an officer in the Union Army during the American Civil War who served as captain in the Philadelphia 23rd Pennsylvania Infantry Regiment, a regiment of the Union Forces, with his brother, Colonel Federico Fernández Cavada. He served with distinction in the Army of the Potomac in the battles of Fredericksburg and Gettysburg and was a "special aide-de-camp" to General Andrew A. Humphreys. After the war, Fernández Cavada was appointed as consul in Cienfuegos, Cuba. He joined his brother, who had been in Trinidad, in the Cuban insurrection against Spanish rule and succeeded him as Commander-in-Chief of the Cinco Villas. He was killed in action.

Early years
Fernández Cavada was one of three sons born in Cienfuegos, Cuba to Isidoro Fernández Cavada and Emily Howard Gatier, an American citizen and native of Philadelphia. After his father's death in 1838, he moved with his mother and siblings to Philadelphia. Fernández Cavada's mother met and married Samuel Dutton and the family resided at 222 Spruce Street, Philadelphia. Fernández Cavada received his primary and secondary education at Philadelphia's Central High School.

American Civil War

Upon the outbreak of the American Civil War, both Adolfo and his brother Federico joined the Philadelphia 23rd Pennsylvania Infantry Regiment, a regiment of the Union Forces. The regiment was assigned to the Army of the Potomac. Federico was transferred to 114th Pennsylvania Infantry Regiment, while Adolfo remained with the regiment as an aide to General Andrew A. Humphreys. Adolfo participated in various battles including the Battle of Fredericksburg and the Battle of Gettysburg.

He was wounded during the Battle of Gettysburg when his horse was shot and killed from under him. Fernández Cavada kept a diary during the war which is considered to be one of the most vivid and articulate accounts of the Battle of Gettysburg. His eyewitness account of the famous conflict provided an expressively descriptive account of the battle. During one day of the July battle, he recorded how "The air was soon full of flying shot, shell and canister--and a groan here and there attested their affect. ...the roar of musketry and the crashing, pounding noise of guns and bursting shells was deafening..."

Cuba’s Ten Years War
After the war, Fernández Cavada was appointed as United States consul at Cienfuegos, Cuba. Fernández Cavada resigned his position upon the Cuban insurrection against Spanish rule, which became known as Cuba's Ten Years' War (1868–1878). Together with his brother Federico, who had also resigned from his appointment as consul to Trinidad, he joined the Cuban insurgents in their quest for Cuba's independence.

In February 1869, Fernández Cavada attacked the town of Palmira. He led his men in the battles of Altos de Potrerillo and Saltadero de Siguanea and in the attack against the Arimao armory. On November 5, 1869, the men under Fernández Cavada's command took the town of Cienfuegos and a month later Arroyo Blanco. On April 4, 1870, Fernández Cavada was named Commander-in-Chief of the Cinco Villas with the rank of Mayor General, succeeding his brother Federico, who was named Commander-in-Chief of all the Cuban forces.

Death
Adolfo's brother Federico was captured by the Spanish authorities and sentenced to die by firing squad in July 1871. On December 18, 1871, Fernández Cavada was killed in battle at the coffee estate, La Adelaida, near Santiago de Cuba.

Awards and decorations
Fernández Cavada's awards and decorations include the following:

See also

Hispanics in the American Civil War
Federico Fernández Cavada

Notes

References

1832 births
1871 deaths
People from Cienfuegos
Union Army officers
Cuban soldiers
American consuls
People of the Ten Years' War
Guerrillas killed in action